This is a list of the oldest living people who have been verified to be alive as of the dates of the cited supporting sources. It was estimated in 2015 that between 150 and 600 living people had reached the age of 110. The true number is uncertain, as not all supercentenarians are known to researchers at a given time, and some claims cannot be validated or are fraudulent.

Maria Branyas of Spain is the world's oldest living person whose age has been validated.

Oldest living people

Notes

References 

 
oldest living people